Lorentz is an unincorporated community in Upshur County, West Virginia, United States. Lorentz has a post office with ZIP code 26229.

The community was named after Jacob Lorentz, a businessperson in the banking industry.

Climate
The climate in this area is characterized by relatively high temperatures and evenly distributed precipitation throughout the year.  According to the Köppen Climate Classification system, Lorentz has a Humid subtropical climate, abbreviated "Cfa" on climate maps.
<div style="width:75%;">

References

Unincorporated communities in Upshur County, West Virginia
Unincorporated communities in West Virginia